Jalan Tuanku Abdul Halim, formerly known as Jalan Duta, is a major highway in Kuala Lumpur, Malaysia. It connects Segambut to the Parliament interchange on the Kuala Lumpur Middle Ring Road 1. It was named after the fifth and fourteenth Yang di-Pertuan Agong, Tuanku Abdul Halim Muadzam Shah of Kedah (reigned 1970–1975 and 2011–2016).

History
It used to be known as Guilemard Road. The road was constructed in the early 1960s.

On 26 November 2014, the Kuala Lumpur City Hall (DBKL) changed the name of Jalan Duta to Jalan Tuanku Abdul Halim. There was public opposition to the renaming, as Jalan Duta was a well-established name and the name change went against the common policy of not naming roads after living public figures, but despite this the government went ahead with the renaming.

Segambut roundabout interchange
The Segambut roundabout has been upgraded into four-level interchange. It was constructed between 2004 and 2006. The project was led by Malaysian Public Works Department (JKR), Kuala Lumpur City Hall and the main contractor Ahmad Zaki Resources Berhad (AZRB). This four-level interchange was opened to traffic on 26 February 2007.

Interchange to the new Istana Negara
Meanwhile, the interchange to the new Istana Negara was constructed in 2007 and was completed in 2011.

List of interchanges

See also
 Kuala Lumpur Inner Ring Road
 Kuala Lumpur Middle Ring Road 1
 Kuala Lumpur Middle Ring Road 2

Highways in Malaysia
Expressways and highways in the Klang Valley
Roads in Kuala Lumpur